Lancelot Holland (1887–1941) was a Royal Navy vice admiral. Admiral Holland may also refer to:

Cedric Holland (1889–1950), British Royal Navy vice admiral
Edmund Holland, 4th Earl of Kent (1383–1408), English admiral
Henry Holland, 3rd Duke of Exeter (1430–1475), English admiral
John Holland, 1st Duke of Exeter (c. 1352–1400), English admiral
John Holland, 2nd Duke of Exeter (1395–1447), English admiral
Michael P. Holland (born 1964), U.S. Navy rear admiral 
Swinton Colthurst Holland (1844–1922), British Royal Navy rear admiral

See also
Deric Holland-Martin (1906–1977), British Royal Navy admiral